The New Democratic Party (NDP; , NPD) is a federal political party in Canada. Widely described as social democratic, the party occupies the left, to centre-left on the political spectrum, sitting to the left of the Liberal Party. The party was founded in 1961 by the Co-operative Commonwealth Federation (CCF) and the Canadian Labour Congress (CLC).

The federal and provincial (or territorial) level NDPs are more integrated than other political parties in Canada, and have shared membership (except for the New Democratic Party of Quebec). The NDP has never won the largest share of seats at the federal level and thus has never formed government. From 2011 to 2015, it formed the Official Opposition, but apart from that, it has been the third or fourth-largest party in the House of Commons. However, the party has held considerable influence during periods of Liberal minority governments. Sub-national branches of the NDP have formed the government in six provinces (Ontario, Manitoba, Saskatchewan, Alberta, British Columbia, and Nova Scotia) and the territory of Yukon.

The NDP supports a mixed economy, broader welfare, LGBT rights, international peace, environmental stewardship, and expanding Canada's universal healthcare system to include dental care, mental health care, eye and hearing care, infertility procedures, and prescription drugs.

Since 2017, the NDP has been led by Jagmeet Singh, who is the first visible minority to lead a major federal party in Canada on a permanent basis. Following the 2021 Canadian federal election, it is the fourth-largest party in the House of Commons, with 25 seats.

History

20th century

Origins and early history

In 1956, after the birth of the Canadian Labour Congress (CLC) by a merger of two previous labour congresses, negotiations began between the CLC and the Co-operative Commonwealth Federation (CCF) to bring about an alliance between organized labour and the political left in Canada. In 1958 a joint CCF-CLC committee, the National Committee for the New Party (NCNP), was formed to create a new social democratic political party, with ten members from each group. The NCNP spent the next three years laying down the foundations of the New Party, the party's interim name pending a national convention. During this process, a large number of New Party Clubs were established to allow like-minded Canadians to join in its founding, and six representatives from New Party Clubs were added to the National Committee. In 1961, at the end of a five-day long founding convention which established its principles, policies and structures, the New Democratic Party was born, and Tommy Douglas, the long-time CCF Premier of Saskatchewan, was elected as its first leader.

David Lewis
At the 1971 leadership convention, an activist group called the Waffle tried to take control of the party but was defeated by David Lewis with the help of the union members. The following year, most of The Waffle split from the NDP and formed their own party. The NDP itself supported the minority government formed by the Pierre Trudeau–led Liberals from 1972 to 1974, although the two parties never entered into a coalition. Together, they succeeded in passing several socially progressive initiatives into law such as pension indexing and the creation of the crown corporation Petro-Canada.

In 1974, the NDP worked with the Progressive Conservatives to pass a motion of non-confidence, forcing an election. However, it backfired as Trudeau's Liberals regained a majority government, mostly at the expense of the NDP, which lost half its seats. Lewis lost his own riding and resigned as leader the following year.

Ed Broadbent
Under Ed Broadbent (1975–1989) the NDP attempted to find a more populist image to contrast with the governing parties, focusing on more pocketbook issues than on ideological fervour. The party played a critical role during Joe Clark's minority government of 1979–1980, moving the non-confidence motion on John Crosbie's 1979 budget that brought down the Progressive Conservative government and forced the 1980 election that brought the Liberal Party back to power.

In the 1984 election, which saw the Progressive Conservatives under Brian Mulroney win the most seats in Canadian history, the NDP won 30 seats, while the governing Liberals fell to 40 seats.

The NDP set a then-record of 43 members of parliament (MPs) elected to the house in the election of 1988. The Liberals, however, had reaped most of the benefits of opposing the Canada–United States Free Trade Agreement to emerge as the dominant alternative to the ruling PC government. In 1989, Broadbent stepped down after 14 years as federal leader of the NDP.

Audrey McLaughlin
At the party's leadership convention in 1989, former BC Premier Dave Barrett and Yukon MP Audrey McLaughlin were the main contenders for the leadership. During the campaign, Barrett argued that the party should be concerned with western alienation, rather than focusing its attention on Quebec. The Quebec wing of the NDP strongly opposed Barrett's candidacy, with Phil Edmonston, the party's main spokesman in Quebec, threatening to resign from the party if Barrett won. McLaughlin ran on a more traditional approach, and became the first woman to lead a major federal political party in Canada.

Although enjoying strong support among organized labour and rural voters in the Prairies, McLaughlin tried to expand their support into Quebec without much success. Under McLaughlin, the party did manage to win an election in Quebec for the first time when Edmonston won a 1990 by-election.

McLaughlin and the NDP were routed in the 1993 election, where the party won only nine seats, three seats short of official party status in the House of Commons. This was, and remains, the NDP's lowest seat total in any election since the party's founding in 1961; the election also resulted in the lowest-ever total number of votes received by the NDP in a federal election. The loss was blamed on the unpopularity of NDP provincial governments under Bob Rae in Ontario and Mike Harcourt in British Columbia and the loss of a significant portion of the Western vote to the Reform Party, which promised a more decentralized and democratic federation along with right-wing economic reforms.

Alexa McDonough
McLaughlin resigned in 1995 and was succeeded by Alexa McDonough, the former leader of the Nova Scotia NDP. In contrast to traditional Canadian practice, where an MP for a safe seat stands down to allow a newly elected leader a chance to enter Parliament via a by-election, McDonough opted to wait until the next election to enter Parliament.

The party recovered somewhat in the 1997 election, electing 21 members. The NDP made a breakthrough in Atlantic Canada, a region where they had been practically nonexistent at the federal level. Before 1997, they had won only three seats in the Atlantic in their entire history. However, in 1997 they won eight seats in that region. The party was able to harness the discontent of voters in the Atlantic, who were upset over cuts to employment insurance and other social programs implemented by Jean Chrétien's Liberal majority government.

In the November 2000 election, the NDP campaigned primarily on the issue of Medicare but lost significant support. The governing Liberals ran an effective campaign on their economic record and managed to recapture some of the Atlantic ridings lost to the NDP in the 1997 election. The initial high electoral prospects of the Canadian Alliance under new leader Stockwell Day also hurt the NDP as many supporters strategically voted Liberal to keep the Alliance from winning. The NDP finished with 13 MPs—just barely over the threshold for official party status.

McDonough announced her resignation as party leader for family reasons in June 2002 (effective upon her successor's election).

21st century

Jack Layton
A Toronto city councillor and recent President of the Federation of Canadian Municipalities, Jack Layton was elected at the party's leadership election in Toronto on January 25, 2003.

The 2004 election produced mixed results for the NDP. It increased its total vote by more than a million votes; however, despite Layton's optimistic predictions of reaching 40 seats, the NDP only gained five seats in the election, for a total of 19. The party was disappointed to see its two Saskatchewan incumbents defeated in close races by the new Conservative Party (created by merger of the Alliance and PC parties), perhaps because of the unpopularity of the NDP provincial government.

The Liberals were re-elected, though this time as a minority government. Combined, the Liberals and NDP had 154 seats – one short of the total needed for the balance of power. As has been the case with Liberal minorities in the past, the NDP were in a position to make gains on the party's priorities, such as fighting health care privatization, fulfilling Canada's obligation to the Kyoto Protocol, and electoral reform. The party used Prime Minister Paul Martin's politically precarious position caused by the sponsorship scandal to force investment in multiple federal programs, agreeing not to help topple the government provided that some major concessions in the federal budget were ceded to.

On November 9, 2005, after the findings of the Gomery Inquiry were released, Layton notified the Liberal government that continued NDP support would require a ban on private healthcare. When the Liberals refused, Layton announced that he would introduce a motion on November 24 that would ask Martin to call a federal election in February to allow for several pieces of legislation to be passed. The Liberals turned down this offer. On November 28, 2005, Conservative leader Stephen Harper's motion of no confidence was seconded by Layton and it was passed by all three opposition parties, forcing an election.

During the election the NDP won 29 seats, a significant increase of 10 seats from the 19 won in 2004. It was the fourth-best performance in party history, approaching the level of popular support enjoyed in the 1980s. The NDP kept all of the 18 seats it held at the dissolution of Parliament. While the party gained no seats in Atlantic Canada, Quebec, or the Prairie provinces, it gained five seats in British Columbia, five more in Ontario and the Western Arctic riding of the Northwest Territories.

The Conservatives won a minority government in the 2006 election, and initially the NDP was the only party that would not be able to pass legislation with the Conservatives. However, following a series of floor crossings, the NDP also came to hold the balance of power. The NDP voted against the government in all four confidence votes in the 39th parliament, the only party to do so. However, it worked with the Conservatives on other issues, including in passing the Federal Accountability Act and pushing for changes to the Clean Air Act.

Following that election the NDP caucus rose to 30 members with the victory of NDP candidate Thomas Mulcair in a by-election in Outremont. This marked the second time ever (and first time in seventeen years) that the NDP won a riding in Quebec. The party won 37 seats in the 2008 federal election, the best performance since the 1988 total of 43. This included a breakthrough in the riding of Edmonton-Strathcona, only the second time the NDP had managed to win a seat in Alberta in the party's history.

In the 2011 federal election the NDP won a record 103 seats, becoming the Official Opposition for the first time in the party's history. The party had a historic breakthrough in Quebec, where they won 59 out of 75 seats, dominating Montreal and sweeping Quebec City and the Outaouais. This meant that a majority of the party's MPs now came from a province where they had only ever had two candidates elected in the party's history. The NDP's success in Quebec was mirrored by the collapse of the Bloc Québécois, which lost all but four of its 47 seats, and the collapse of the Liberal Party nationally, which was cut down to just 34 seats, its worst-ever result. This also marked the first time in history where the Liberal Party was neither the government nor the Official Opposition, as the NDP had taken over the latter role. The NDP was now the second largest party in the House of Commons opposing a Conservative majority government.

In July 2011, Layton announced that he was suffering from a new cancer and would take a leave of absence, projected to last until the resumption of Parliament in September. He would retain his position of NDP Leader and Leader of the Opposition. The party confirmed his suggestion of Hull—Aylmer MP Nycole Turmel to carry out the functions of party leader in his absence. Layton died from his cancer on August 22, 2011.

Tom Mulcair
In his final letter, Layton called for a leadership election to be held in early 2012 to choose his successor, which was held on March 24, 2012, and elected new leader Tom Mulcair.

Despite early campaign polls which showed the NDP in first place, the party lost 59 seats in the 2015 election and fell back to third place in Parliament. By winning 44 seats, Mulcair was able to secure the second best showing in the party's history, winning one more seat than Ed Broadbent managed in the 1988 election, but with a smaller share of the popular vote. NDP seat gains in Saskatchewan and British Columbia were offset by numerical losses in almost every other region, while in Alberta and Manitoba the party maintained its existing seat counts. The party was locked out of the Atlantic Region and the Territories, and lost over half of its seats in Ontario including all of its seats in Toronto. In Quebec, the NDP lost seats to all three of the other major parties, namely the Liberals, Conservatives, and Bloc Québécois, though it managed to place second in both vote share (25.4%) and seats (16) behind the Liberals in the province. The election resulted in a Liberal majority government.

Mulcair's leadership faced criticism following the election, culminating in his losing a leadership review vote held at the NDP's policy convention in Edmonton, Alberta on April 10, 2016. This marked the first time in Canadian federal politics that a leader was defeated in a confidence vote. Consequently, his successor was to be chosen at a leadership election to be held no later than October 2017, with Mulcair agreeing to remain as leader until then.

Jagmeet Singh
On October 1, 2017, Jagmeet Singh, the first person of a visible minority group to lead a major Canadian federal political party on a permanent basis, won the leadership vote to head the NDP on the first ballot.

In the 2019 federal election, the NDP won only 24 seats in its worst result since 2004, shedding 15 seats. Alexandre Boulerice, who was elected to his third term in Rosemont—La Petite-Patrie, was the only NDP candidate to win a seat in Quebec, while the party lost all three of its Saskatchewan ridings (Desnethé—Missinippi—Churchill River, Regina—Lewvan, and Saskatoon West) to the Conservatives. The party remained shut out of Toronto and lost two of its MPs (Cheryl Hardcastle in Windsor—Tecumseh and Tracey Ramsey in Essex) in the rest of Ontario, while making small or no gains in the popular vote in Manitoba, Newfoundland and Labrador, Alberta and Nunavut. In British Columbia, the NDP lost three seats (Kootenay—Columbia, Port Moody—Coquitlam, and, after having lost it at a by-election, Nanaimo—Ladysmith) but retained most of their support in the province.

Following the election, the NDP held the balance of power as the Liberals won a minority government, although it fell back to fourth place behind the resurgent Bloc Québécois. During the COVID-19 pandemic, the NDP used its leverage to lobby the Liberals to be more generous in their financial aid to Canadians, including by extending of the Canada Emergency Response Benefit (CERB) program, which was a key demand in order to provide confidence to the government in the autumn of 2020.

In the snap 2021 federal election, the NDP made minor gains in both vote share and seat count, winning in 25 ridings. The party won a second seat in Alberta for the first time by electing Blake Desjarlais in Edmonton Griesbach and picked up two more seats in British Columbia with Lisa Marie Barron and Bonita Zarrillo reclaiming Nanaimo—Ladysmith and Port Moody—Coquitlam. These gains were offset by losses to the Liberals in St. John's East and Hamilton Mountain, both constituencies where the incumbent NDP candidate did not stand for re-election. Overall, the election resulted in no change to the balance of power in the House of Commons. In March 2022, the NDP agreed to a confidence and supply deal with Justin Trudeau's Liberal Party.

Ideology and policies
The NDP evolved in 1961 from a merger of the Canadian Labour Congress (CLC) and the Co-operative Commonwealth Federation (CCF). The CCF grew from populist, agrarian and socialist roots into a modern social democratic party. Although the CCF was part of the Christian left and the Social Gospel movement, the NDP is secular and pluralistic. It has broadened to include concerns of the New Left, and advocates issues such as LGBT rights, international peace, and environmental stewardship. The NDP also supports a mixed economy and broader welfare.

Ideological orientation
The NDP's constitution states that both social democracy and democratic socialism are influences on the party. Specific inclusion of the party's history as the continuation of the more radical Co-operative Commonwealth Federation, and specific identification of the "democratic socialist" tradition as a continuing influence on the party are part of the language of the preamble to the party's constitution:

Health care
The NDP states that it is committed to public health care. The party states that it fights for "a national, universal, public pharmacare program to make sure that all Canadians can access the prescription medicine they need with their health card, not their credit card – saving money and improving health outcomes for everyone". The party also states its support for expanding services covered under the national health care system to include dental care, mental health care, eye and hearing care, infertility procedures, and prescription drugs. Regarding dentistry, the NDP notes that "one in three Canadians has no dental insurance and over six million people don't visit the dentist every year because they can't afford to. Too many people are forced to go without the care they need until the pain is so severe that they are forced to seek relief in hospital emergency rooms".

Electoral achievements
Since its formation, the party has had a presence in the House of Commons. It was the third largest political party from 1965 to 1993, when the party dropped to fourth and lost official party status. The NDP's peak period of policy influence in those periods was during the minority Liberal governments of Lester B. Pearson (1963–68) and Pierre Trudeau (1972–74). The NDP regained official status in 1997, and played a similar role in the Liberal and Conservative minority governments of 2004–2006 and 2006–2011, respectively. Following the 2011 election, the party became the second-largest party and formed the Official Opposition in the 41st Canadian Parliament.

Provincial New Democratic parties, which are organizationally sections of the federal party, have governed in six of the ten provinces and a territory. The NDP governs the province of British Columbia, forms the Official Opposition in Alberta, Manitoba, Saskatchewan, and Ontario, and have sitting members in every provincial legislature except those of Quebec, New Brunswick, and Prince Edward Island. The NDP has previously formed the government in the provinces of Alberta, Manitoba, Ontario, Saskatchewan, British Columbia, Nova Scotia and the Yukon Territory. The NDP has previously had at least one sitting member in every provincial legislature except that of Quebec.

While members of the party are active in municipal politics, the party does not organize at that level. For example, though former Toronto mayor David Miller was an NDP member during his successful 2003 and 2006 mayoral campaigns, his campaigns were not affiliated with the NDP.

Provincial and territorial wings

Unlike most other Canadian federal parties, the NDP is integrated with its provincial and territorial parties. Holding membership of a provincial or territorial section of the NDP includes automatic membership in the federal party, and this precludes a person from being a member of different parties at the federal and provincial levels. Membership lists are maintained by the provinces and territories.

There have been three exceptions: Nunavut, the Northwest Territories, and Quebec. In Nunavut and in the Northwest Territories, whose territorial legislatures have non-partisan consensus governments, the federal NDP is promoted by its riding associations, since each territory is composed of only one federal riding.

In Quebec, the historical New Democratic Party of Quebec was integrated with the federal party from 1963 until 1989, when the two agreed to sever their structural ties after the Quebec party adopted a sovereigntist platform. From then on, the federal NDP was represented in Quebec only by their Quebec Section, whose activities in the province were limited to the federal level. However, following the party's breakthrough in the province in the 2011 federal election, the NDP announced their plans to recreate a provincial party in Quebec in time for the following Quebec general election. The modern New Democratic Party of Quebec party was registered with the Chief Electoral Officer of Quebec on January 30, 2014, but it failed to nominate any candidates in the 2014 election. The new NPDQ is not affiliated to the federal NDP due to more recent provincial laws in Quebec which disallow provincial parties from affiliating with federal parties.

The NDP in Quebec has been in decline since 2016, struggling to attract local leaders and support.

(Provincial/territorial wings of current NDP government are in bold)

The most successful provincial section of the party has been the Saskatchewan New Democratic Party, which first came to power in 1944 as the Co-operative Commonwealth Federation under Tommy Douglas and has won eleven of the province's elections since then. In Canada, Douglas is often cited as the "Father of Medicare" since, as Saskatchewan Premier, he introduced Canada's first publicly funded, universal healthcare system to the province. Despite the historic success of the Saskatchewan branch of the party, the NDP was shut out of Saskatchewan for the 2004, 2006, 2008, and 2011 federal elections, before winning three seats there in the 2015 federal election. The NDP would once again be shut out of Saskatchewan as part of the Conservatives sweep of the province in the 2019 election.

The New Democratic Party has also formed government in Alberta, British Columbia, Manitoba, Nova Scotia, Ontario and Yukon.

Current members of Parliament

44th Parliament

 Charlie Angus, Timmins—James Bay (ON) Critic for Official Languages, Ethics, Federal Economic Development Initiative for Northern Ontario, Indigenous Youth, Income Inequality and Affordability, Deputy Critic for Labour
 Niki Ashton, Churchill—Keewatinook Aski (MB) Critic for Public Ownership and Transport, Deputy Critic for Women and Gender Equality
 Taylor Bachrach, Skeena—Bulkley Valley (BC) Critic for Infrastructure and Communities 
 Lisa Marie Barron, Nanaimo—Ladysmith (BC)
 Daniel Blaikie, Elmwood—Transcona (MB) Critic for Democratic Reform, Employment, Workforce Development and Disability Inclusion, Export Promotion and International Trade, Western Economic Diversification, Deputy Critic for Finance 
 Rachel Blaney, North Island—Powell River (BC) Caucus Whip, Critic for Veterans Affairs 
 Alexandre Boulerice, Rosemont—La Petite-Patrie (QC) Deputy Leader, Critic for Canadian Economic Development for Quebec Regions, Canadian Heritage, Deputy Critic for Environment and Climate Change
 Richard Cannings, South Okanagan—West Kootenay (BC) Critic for Natural Resources, Deputy Critic for Transport
 Laurel Collins, Victoria (BC) Critic for Environment and Climate Change, Deputy Critic for Infrastructure and Communities 
 Don Davies, Vancouver Kingsway (BC) Critic for Health, Deputy Critic for Public Safety and Emergency Preparedness
 Blake Desjarlais, Edmonton Griesbach (AB) Deputy Caucus Chair
 Randall Garrison, Esquimalt—Saanich—Sooke (BC) Critic for National Defence, Justice, Sexual Orientation and Gender Identity
 Leah Gazan, Winnipeg Centre (MB) Critic for Families, Children and Social Development, Deputy Critic for Immigration, Refugees and Citizenship
 Matthew Green, Hamilton Centre (ON) Critic for National Revenue, Public Services and Procurement, Treasury Board, Deputy Critic for Ethics
 Carol Hughes, Algoma—Manitoulin—Kapuskasing (ON) Asst. Deputy Speaker
 Lori Idlout, Nunavut (NU)
 Gord Johns, Courtenay—Alberni (BC) Critic for Economic Development, Fisheries, Oceans, and the Canadian Coast Guard, Small Business, Tourism, Deputy Critic for Crown-Indigenous Relations and Indigenous Services 
 Peter Julian, New Westminster—Burnaby (BC) House Leader, Critic for Finance, Deputy Critic for Canadian Heritage 
 Jenny Kwan, Vancouver East (BC) Caucus Chair, Critic for Housing, Immigration, Refugees and Citizenship, Deputy Critic for Health
 Alistair MacGregor, Cowichan—Malahat—Langford (BC) Critic for Agriculture, Rural Economic Development, Deputy Critic for Justice 
 Heather McPherson, Edmonton—Strathcona (AB) Deputy Caucus Whip, Critic for International Development, Deputy Critic for Foreign Affairs 
 Brian Masse, Windsor West (ON) Critic for Digital Government, Great Lakes, Innovation, Science and Industry, Telecommunications
 Lindsay Mathyssen, London—Fanshawe (ON) Deputy House Leader, Critic for Diversity and Inclusion and Youth, Women and Gender Equality, Deputy Critic for Export Promotion and International Trade, Small Business
 Jagmeet Singh, Burnaby South (BC) Leader, Critic for Crown-Indigenous Relations, Indigenous Services, Intergovernmental Affairs
 Bonita Zarrillo, Port Moody—Coquitlam (BC)

Federal leaders

A list of leaders (including acting leaders) since 1961.

 Notes

Federal party presidents
The party president is the administrative chairperson of the party, chairing party conventions, councils and executive meetings.

Election results

Results timeline

Logos

Notes

See also

 Broadbent Institute
 Douglas-Coldwell Foundation 
 Regina Manifesto
 Left Caucus
 New Democratic Party Socialist Caucus
 New Politics Initiative

References

External links

 
 New Democratic Party – Canadian Political Parties and Political Interest Groups – Web Archive created by the University of Toronto Libraries
 Co-operative Commonwealth Federation and New Democratic Party fonds at Library and Archives Canada

 
1961 establishments in Canada
Political parties established in 1961
Social democratic parties in Canada
Non-interventionist parties
Centre-left parties
Progressive Alliance
Socialism in Canada
Labour parties in Canada
Federal political parties in Canada